The Swiss Metalworkers' and Watchmakers' Union (SMUV) was a trade union representing workers in the metal and watchmaking industries in Switzerland.

The union was founded in 1915, when the Swiss Metalworkers' Union merged with the Federation of Watch Industry Workers, which was in debt, following an unsuccessful strike.  It affiliated to the Swiss Trade Union Federation.  The union grew rapidly during World War I, membership peaking at 85,000 in 1919, but then falling to just 43,000 in 1925.  This was a difficult period for the union, which lost its collective agreements, renounced strikes, and expelled its communist members, but was able to expand unemployment insurance.

Under the long-term leadership of Konrad Ilg, the union began growing again, rapidly after World War II.  Membership reached a new peak of 145,000 in 1972, then fell again.  In 1992, it absorbed the Swiss Clothing, Leather and Equipment Workers' Union, renaming itself as the Union for Industry, Trade and Services, while retaining the SMUV abbreviation.

By 1998, the union had 95,315 members, of whom 91% worked in the metal industry, and the remainder across a variety of sectors.  In 2004, it merged with the Union of Commerce, Transport and Food and the Union of Construction and Industry, to form Unia.

Presidents
1915: Oskar Schneeberger
1917: Konrad Ilg
1954: Arthur Steiner
1958: Ernst Wüthrich
1972: Hans Mischler
1976: Gilbert Tschumi
1980: Fritz Reimann
1988: Agostino Tarabusi
1992: Christiane Brunner
2000: Renzo Ambrosetti

References

Metal trade unions
Trade unions established in 1915
Trade unions disestablished in 2004
Trade unions in Switzerland